Rosa Giannetta (also known as Rosa Giannetta Alberoni; 11 April 1945  3 January 2021) was an Italian novelist, journalist and professor of sociology.

Biography 
Giannetta was born in Trevico, in the province of Avellino, Italy. In 1974 she graduated from the University Institute of Modern Languages (IULM) in Milan with a degree in modern foreign languages and literature. 

In her initial research, she focused on a sociological study of young people and their language, and later moved into studying philosophy. In the 1990s, she studied the works of Rousseau, Hegel and Marx and the philosophical issues that led to the development of anti-Christianity in Europe. She later also analysed Michelangelo's Sistine Chapel frescoes, and wrote a critique of Darwinist ideology. She stated that Darwinism produces attitudes such as racism, classism and biological discrimination. Giannetta won the Gianni Brera Award for non-fiction.

As a journalist, Giannetta wrote for newspapers such as La Stampa, Il Giorno and Corriere della Sera and for magazines such as Gioia, Anna and Oggi. She also contributed to radio and television broadcasts.

Giannetta also wrote historical fiction. She wrote a series of novels set between 1786 and 1814 in the Napoleonic era and located between the Kingdoms of Naples and Milan, and a second series centred on four generations of a family that moves between Versilia and Milan. Her novels won two awards: the Gargano Prize for literature and the Romeo Gigli Prize for fiction.

Personal life 
She married Francesco Alberoni, a sociologist, in 1988, and began using his surname in addition to her own.

Giannetta died on 3 January 2021 at her home in Forte dei Marmi after an illness.

Published works

Academic works 

 Alberoni, R. (1984). L'era dei mass media: Note sociologiche sulla storia delle comunicazioni di massa. Milano: Coop. libraria I.U.L.M.
Giannetta, A. R., Di, F. G., & ISTUR. (1992). Complicità e competizione. Milano: Harlequin Mondadori.
Alberoni, R. G. (1993). Gli esploratori del tempo. Le concezioni della storia da Vico a Popper. Milano, Rizzoli.
 Giannetta, A. R. (2000). Hegel, sociologo nostro contemporaneo.
 Giannetta, A. R. (2007). La cacciata di Cristo. Milano: Rizzoli.
Alberoni, R. G., & Martino, R. R. (2007). Il Dio di Michelangelo e la barba di Darwin. Milano: Rizzoli.

Fiction 

 Alberoni, R. G. (1991). L'orto del paradiso. Milano: A. Mondadori.
 Alberoni, R. G. (1994). Paolo e Francesca. Milano: Rizzoli.
 Alberoni, R. G. (1998). Io voglio. Milano: Biblioteca universale Rizzoli.
Alberoni, R. G. (1999). Sinfonia. Milano: Rizzoli.
Giannetta, A. R. (2005). La montagna di luce. Milano: Rizzoli.
Giannetta, A. R. (2010). Intrigo al Concilio Vaticano II. Verona: Fede & Cultura.
 Alberoni, R. G. (2011). Arianna sfida il destino. Milano: Rizzoli.

References

External links
 

1945 births
2021 deaths
People from the Province of Avellino
Christian creationists
Italian women journalists
Italian sociologists
Italian women sociologists
20th-century Italian journalists
21st-century Italian journalists
20th-century Italian novelists
21st-century Italian novelists
20th-century Italian women writers
21st-century Italian women writers
Italian women novelists
Italian historical novelists
Women historical novelists
IULM University of Milan alumni